Olin Wellborn (June 18, 1843 – December 6, 1921) was a United States representative from Texas and a United States district judge of the United States District Court for the Southern District of California.

Education and career

Born on June 18, 1843, in Cumming, Forsyth County, Georgia, Wellborn attended the common schools, the University of North Carolina at Chapel Hill and graduated from Emory University in 1862. He enlisted in the Confederate States Army in 1861 and served throughout the American Civil War, attaining the rank of captain in Company B, Fourth Georgia Cavalry. At the close of the war he settled in Atlanta, Georgia. He studied law, was admitted to the bar and entered private practice in Atlanta from 1866 to 1871. He continued private practice in Dallas, Texas starting in 1871.

Congressional service

Wellborn was elected as a Democrat from Texas's 3rd congressional district and Texas's 6th congressional district to the United States House of Representatives of the 46th United States Congress and to the three succeeding Congresses, serving from March 4, 1879, to March 3, 1887. He was Chairman of the Committee on Indian Affairs for the 48th and 49th United States Congresses. He was an unsuccessful candidate for renomination in 1886 to the 50th United States Congress.

Later career

Following his departure from Congress, Wellborn resumed private practice in San Diego, California from 1887 to 1893, and in Los Angeles, California starting in 1893.

Federal judicial service

Wellborn was nominated by President Grover Cleveland on February 25, 1895, to a seat on the United States District Court for the Southern District of California vacated by Judge Erskine Mayo Ross. He was confirmed by the United States Senate on March 1, 1895, and received his commission the same day. His service terminated on January 31, 1915, due to his retirement.

Death

Wellborn died on December 6, 1921, in Los Angeles. He was interred in Rosedale Cemetery (now Angelus-Rosedale Cemetery) in Los Angeles.

Family

Wellborn's daughter married Burton E. Green, a co-founder of Beverly Hills, California.

References

Sources

 
 

1843 births
1921 deaths
People from Cumming, Georgia
People from Los Angeles
Emory University alumni
University of North Carolina at Chapel Hill alumni
Confederate States Army officers
Judges of the United States District Court for the Southern District of California
United States federal judges appointed by Grover Cleveland
19th-century American judges
California Democrats
Democratic Party members of the United States House of Representatives from Texas
Burials at Angelus-Rosedale Cemetery